Five Nights at Freddy's 4 is a survival horror video game developed and published by Scott Cawthon. It is the fourth installment of the Five Nights at Freddy's series. The game takes place in the bedroom of a child, where the player must avoid attack by nightmarish animatronics that stalk them.

The game was announced in mid-2015 under the working title Five Nights at Freddy's: The Final Chapter. It was originally planned for release on October 31, 2015, however the game was pushed forward to August 8, then to July 23 when it was unexpectedly released on Steam. It was released for Android devices on July 25, 2015, and for iOS devices on August 3, 2015. A port for Nintendo Switch, PlayStation 4 and Xbox One was released on November 29, 2019.

Upon release, the game received mixed reviews from critics, who praised its unsettling atmosphere but were polarized over the game's mechanics. Five Nights at Freddy's 4 is the only game in the entire Five Nights at Freddy’s series that features no spoken dialogue. The game was followed by Five Nights at Freddy's: Sister Location, released on October 7, 2016.

Gameplay
Five Nights at Freddy's 4 is a point-and-click survival horror game. Unlike previous installments, it is set in a child's bedroom rather then a security office. The player, who takes the role of a child, must defend themselves from variants of the four animatronics of the first game—Freddy, Bonnie, Chica and Foxy—for five nights. Each night lasts from 12AM to 6AM, or roughly eight minutes in real time. If the player does not sufficiently monitor the four entrances—the bed, two side doors and the closet—an animatronic will jump scare and kill them, and they must start the night over again. The player must rely on audio cues, such as muffled footsteps, to determine whether an animatronic is approaching, to shine their flashlight or to shut the door. 

In between nights, the game shifts into "faux-retro" minigames which follow the child the player is playing as, who is subject to abuse from their father and brother.

After beating each night, the player may play a timed minigame titled "Fun with Plushtrap" (in the Halloween update, Plushtrap is replaced by a nightmarish version of Balloon Boy from the second game) in which a plush edition of Springtrap, the central animatronic in Five Nights at Freddy's 3, must be lured to the top of an "X" marked on the ground within a specific amount of time. If the player succeeds, the player will start the next night at 2:00 a.m. (1:00 a.m. in challenge modes) Like the main nights, this timed minigame becomes more challenging as the game progresses. The time bonus does not apply to the unlockable modes. Additionally, if the player gets a game over, the bonus is no longer valid for further plays of the same level.

The nightmarish Freddy Fazbear, Bonnie, Chica, and Foxy are antagonists in the first four nights, while a large yellow bear animatronic called Nightmare Fredbear becomes the sole attacker on the fifth night. Completing all five nights will unlock a star and an additional sixth night, where the four animatronics will stalk the player until Nightmare Fredbear takes over at 4:00 a.m. Completing the sixth night will unlock another star and the seventh night titled "Nightmare", in which the animatronics are very aggressive and Nightmare Fredbear is replaced at 4:00 a.m. by an animatronic called Nightmare, who has a unique game over screen compared to other animatronics. A third star and secret code will unlock an eighth night called 20/20/20/20 mode based on the "custom night" modes from the first two games, where the A.I. of the animatronics are set to maximum difficulty. Completing this will grant the fourth star. Other unlockables include galleries of the various animatronics and jumpscares, as well as behind-the-scenes looks at the 3D-modelling process for Fredbear and Foxy. The extra menu also includes the Fun with Plushtrap and Fun with Balloon Boy minigames to play, a cheat menu, and a challenges menu, which includes 4 challenges that have their own stars to unlock.

Plot
A series of minigames playable between nights tells the story of a young boy who is speculated to be the player character. In the first minigame, the boy is locked in his bedroom with plush toys, which he calls his "friends". One of the plushes, based on the animatronic "Fredbear", provides consolation for the boy as he is teased and tormented for his fear of a family restaurant near his home. In the subsequent four minigames, he is deliberately scared, abandoned at the restaurant, teased by his peers, and unwillingly locked in the restaurant's parts and services room.  Two easter eggs can be discovered during the minigames; one shows the purple figure previously featured in the second and third games fitting someone into an animatronic suit, implying he is an employee at the restaurant, while the other shows a program on a television screen dated 1983, presumably the year in which the minigames are set. Rumors are also mentioned of the animatronics of the restaurant coming to life at night.

In the sixth minigame, the boy is shown crying during his birthday party at the restaurant, and a group of bullies wearing animatronic masks, including the boy's older brother, terrorize him. Amused by his fear, they lift him to the real Fredbear's mouth for a "kiss", stuffing his head into the animatronic's mouth. The boy's tears damage Fredbear's springlock system, causing it to forcefully close its mouth and crush the boy's head; this act horrifies the brother and his friends, who can only stare in shock at their mistake. The seventh minigame shows the boy in a black room surrounded by his plush toys. An unknown voice apologizes to the boy, while Fredbear promises that "I will put you back together". The plush toys fade out one by one, and the faint sound of a heart monitor flatlining can be heard, implying that the boy has died.

Throughout the game, if the screen is brightened, the child's story is alluded to through objects beside the bed. When the player turns to the bed, looking to the left of the plush that lies on it, three objects appear at different points in time: a bottle of pills, an IV drip, and a vase of flowers.

If the player completes the "Nightmare" mode of the game, an image of a locked metal trunk is displayed; if the player wiggles the padlocks, text appears stating "Perhaps some things are best left forgotten, for now." Cawthon has remained cryptic about the meaning behind the trunk.

Development
Beginning April 27, 2015, Cawthon posted images on his website teasing another game in the series, originally known as Five Nights at Freddy's 4: The Final Chapter. The images, featuring the characters from the series, cryptically teased at a release on Halloween. A trailer was released on July 13, 2015, hinting that the game took place in the main character's house. The subtitle, The Final Chapter, was dropped.

A demo for the game was released to select YouTubers on July 21, 2015, with the full game being released on July 23, 2015. The game was released for Android devices on July 25, 2015, and for iOS devices on August 3, 2015. On July 27th, 2015, two updates were released, dubbed v1.01 and v1.02, the former making both Chica and Bonnie's breathing sounds louder, as there were a multitude of complaints about the sounds being too quiet and hard to hear. The latter of these updates were merely described as "minor bug fixes". On October 30, 2015, two more updates, both dubbed as v1.1, were released. One consists of a set of cheat options, challenge modes, and an altered version of the "Fun with Plushtrap" minigame that uses a nightmare version of the character Balloon Boy (from Five Nights at Freddy's 2) in place of Plushtrap. The second is a "Halloween Edition" that makes cosmetic changes to Nightmare Bonnie and Nightmare Chica, and introduces nightmare versions of the Five Nights at Freddy's 2s characters Mangle and The Puppet, (known as Nightmarionne in-game) the former replacing Nightmare Foxy and the latter replacing Nightmare. Nightmare Chica's cupcake is also replaced with a Jack-o-Lantern. Unlike other Five Nights at Freddy's games, the game does not feature spoken dialogue (outside easter eggs).

Reception

Five Nights at Freddy's 4 received "mixed or average" reviews according to review aggregator Metacritic, assigning the Windows version a score of 51 out of 100.

Destructoid criticized the gameplay as being too confusing, and gave the game a review score of 4 out of 10. The Escapist gave the game a positive review score of 4 out of 5 stars saying that they liked the reworked mechanics, darker and emotional storyline, scary jumpscares, and sad ending but noted the game's bugs and glitches. Nadia Oxford of Gamezebo gave it 4 out of 5 stars in her review praising it for its intense environment, creepy sounds and graphics, and jumpscares. She criticised the game for being difficult to survive in certain environments when relying on audio cues and the Android version not containing the story-centric minigames.

References

Bibliography

External links

 

2015 video games
Android (operating system) games
4
Indie video games
2010s horror video games
IOS games
Works about missing people
Point-and-click adventure games
Video games about robots
Single-player video games
Video game prequels
Video games set in 1983
Windows games
Nintendo Switch games
PlayStation 4 games
Xbox Cloud Gaming games
Xbox One games
Video games developed in the United States
Clickteam Fusion games
Video games about nightmares
Video games about children